Highland Park Manufacturing Plant and Cotton Oil Complex is a historic industrial complex and national historic district located at Rock Hill, South Carolina.  It encompasses three contributing building and two contributing structures in Rock Hill. The complex includes the Highland Park Manufacturing Plant (1888–89, 1907), the Highland Park Cotton Oil Mill (1902), and the Highland Park Cotton Oil Mill Office (1902). They are the surviving buildings of a larger complex, including a gin and seed house, the rest of which have been demolished. Surrounding the original mill are portions of the mill village. The mill operated until 1968.

It was listed on the National Register of Historic Places in 1992.

References

Historic districts on the National Register of Historic Places in South Carolina
Industrial buildings and structures on the National Register of Historic Places in South Carolina
Buildings and structures in Rock Hill, South Carolina
National Register of Historic Places in Rock Hill, South Carolina
Cottonseed oil
Cotton industry in the United States